La Cite de l'Énergie is a theme park based on local industrial history and located in Shawinigan, Quebec, Canada.

Facilities
The lattice tower consists of a dismantled electricity pylon used for a temporary power line crossing of Saint Lawrence River between Grondines and Lotbinière, during the construction of the tunnel used to ultimately carry the Quebec - New England Transmission line. 

A Historical sector, which consists of two power plants, Northern Aluminum Company (NAC) and Shawinigan 2, and the ruins of a third one (Alcan 16), as well as an electricity distribution station and an aluminium smelter.

The NAC plant (built circa 1906) was privately owned by Alcan and used for its fabrication of aluminium. It had become obsolete by the early 1950s and is now out of production. It is open to visitors.

Shawinigan 2 was established in 1911 and enlarged in 1928 by the Shawinigan Water & Power Company and has been operated by Hydro-Québec since 1963. The structure was erected in the Renaissance and Art Deco architectural styles.  The machinery consists of five generators activated by horizontal turbines and three generators activated by vertical turbines.

Management

La Cité de l'Énergie is administered by a non-profit organization, whose funders are Abitibi-Consolidated, Alcan, Hydro-Québec and the City of Shawinigan.

Robert Trudel has been the general manager and the main spokesperson for La Cité de l'Énergie, since its foundation.

Impact on local tourism

Since it opened in 1997, La Cité de l'Énergie attracted hundreds of thousands of paying visitors. The park is generally open to the public each year from June to September; and to groups during other times of the year.

See also
 History of Hydro-Québec
 List of hydroelectric stations in Quebec
 Lattice tower
 Lise Landry
 Roland Désaulniers

Footnotes

External links
 Cité de l'Énergie

Amusement parks in Canada
Art Deco architecture in Canada
Buildings and structures in Shawinigan
Industry museums in Canada
Museums in Mauricie
1997 establishments in Quebec
Science museums in Canada
Tourist attractions in Mauricie
Amusement parks opened in 1997
Observation towers in Canada